Danijel Šarić (born 27 June 1977) is a Bosnian-Qatari handball player of Serbian descent who plays for Qatari club Al Arabi and the Qatar national team.

Club career
After starting out at his hometown club Sloga Doboj and later playing for Borac Banja Luka, Šarić moved to FR Yugoslavia and joined Crvena zvezda. He spent three seasons at the club and won two consecutive national championships (1997 and 1998). In 1999, Šarić switched to ambitious Sintelon, alongside his teammate Ratko Nikolić.

In 2003, Šarić moved to Spain and signed with Ciudad Real, but never played for the team. He instead spent the entire duration of his contract on loan with Cantabria and Alcobendas. In 2006, Šarić was acquired by Ademar León. He also played for Portland San Antonio. In 2009, Šarić agreed terms with Barcelona. He spent seven seasons at the club and won numerous trophies, including two EHF Champions League titles (2011 and 2015).

International career

Serbia and Montenegro
In the late 1990s, Šarić chose to represent FR Yugoslavia (later known as Serbia and Montenegro) in international competitions, just like his fellow Bosnian Serbs, Mladen Bojinović and Nebojša Golić. He was later named in the preliminary squad for the 2000 Summer Olympics, but was omitted from the final selection. Later on, Šarić participated at the 2005 World Championship and 2006 European Championship. He announced his retirement from the national team in February 2006.

Bosnia and Herzegovina
In October 2009, it was reported that Šarić accepted a call-up to represent his native Bosnia and Herzegovina. He was cleared to play for the team in the Euro 2012 qualifiers, making his debut in a 27–19 away loss at Hungary on 28 October 2010. His last cap came on 12 March 2011 in a 23–21 home loss to Estonia.

Qatar
In October 2014, it was announced that Šarić would be representing Qatar at the 2015 World Championship. He helped the team finish as the tournament's runners-up. The following year, Šarić participated at the 2016 Summer Olympics. He also won three gold medals at three successive Asian Championships (2016, 2018 and 2020).

Honours
Club
Crvena zvezda
 Handball Championship of FR Yugoslavia: 1996–97, 1997–98

Sintelon
 Handball Cup of FR Yugoslavia: 1999–2000

Barcelona
 Liga ASOBAL: 2010–11, 2011–12, 2012–13, 2013–14, 2014–15, 2015–16
 Copa ASOBAL: 2009–10, 2011–12, 2012–13, 2013–14, 2014–15, 2015–16
 Supercopa ASOBAL: 2008–09, 2011–12, 2012–13, 2013–14
 Copa del Rey de Balonmano: 2009–10, 2013–14
 EHF Champions League: 2010–11, 2014–15
 IHF Men's Super Globe: 2013, 2014

Al Duhail
 Qatar Handball League: 2017–18

Al Arabi
 Qatar Handball League: 2019–20

International
Qatar
 Asian Men's Handball Championship: 2016, 2018, 2020
 Asian Games: 2018
 World Men's Handball Championship runner-up: 2015

Individual
 Liga ASOBAL MVP: 2010–11, 2013–14
 Liga ASOBAL Best Goalkeeper: 2010–11, 2011–12, 2012–13 and 2013–14
 Copa ASOBAL Best Goalkeeper: 2010–11, 2011–12, 2014–15
 Supercopa ASOBAL Best Goalkeeper: 2008–09, 2009–10, 2011–12, 2012–13
 Highest percentage of saves in Liga ASOBAL: 2015–16

References

External links

 EHF record
 Olympic record

1977 births
Living people
Asian Games gold medalists for Qatar
Asian Games medalists in handball
Bosnia and Herzegovina expatriate sportspeople in Serbia and Montenegro
Bosnia and Herzegovina expatriate sportspeople in Spain
Bosnia and Herzegovina male handball players
CB Ademar León players
CB Cantabria players
Expatriate handball players
FC Barcelona Handbol players
Handball players at the 2016 Summer Olympics
Handball players at the 2018 Asian Games
Liga ASOBAL players
Medalists at the 2018 Asian Games
Naturalised citizens of Qatar
Olympic handball players of Qatar
People from Doboj
Qatari male handball players
Qatari people of Bosnia and Herzegovina descent
RK Crvena zvezda players
RK Sintelon players
SDC San Antonio players
Serbs of Bosnia and Herzegovina